Stakkels Jim (aka Gas 4) is a studio album by Gasolin' and was released in November 1974. It was the second album to be produced by Roy Thomas Baker.

The raw rock of Gasolin' 3 would on this record be replaced by a more polished and bombastic sound, and for the first time strings would be incorporated. Stakkels Jim does not rock as hard as Gasolin' 3 and songs such as "Bingo" and "Perron 'Gare du Nord' " are quite poppish. However, epic rock songs such as "Legenden om Josha og Ming" and the title song, which was based on the "Auld lang syne" melody, would be the blueprint for their next album, Gas 5.

Stakkels Jim (translation: Poor Jim) was recorded in Rosenberg Studio in Copenhagen with Freddy Hansson as sound engineer. From this album "Onkel 'How Do You Do' " / "Johnny Lee" and "Bingo" / "Alla-Tin-Gala" were released as singles. Stakkels Jim was also released in England with English lyrics as The Last Jim in November 1974.

Stakkels Jim was released on cd in 1987 with Gasolin' 3, but due to lack of space "Legenden om Josha og Ming" and "Johnny Lee" were omitted. In 1991 it was remastered for cd and it is also included in The Black Box (2003).

Track listing 

 "Alla-Tin-Gala" (Larsen-Gasolin'-Mogensen) - 3:24
 "Daddy-Ding-Dong" (Gasolin') - 3:14
 "Bingo (Larsen-Gasolin'-Mogensen)" - 3:03
 "Onkel 'How Do You Do' " (Jönsson-Beckerlee-Gasolin'-Mogensen) - 3:27
 "Legenden om Josha og Ming" (Gasolin') - 5:40
 "Kap Farvel til Ümánarssuaq" (Gasolin') - 3:38
 "Perron 'Gare du Nord' "(Larsen-Gasolin'-Mogensen) - 2:46
 "Damernes nar" (Larsen-Gasolin'-Mogensen) - 3:14
 "Johnny Lee" (Gasolin') - 3:24
 "Stakkels Jim" (trad.arr.-Gasolin'-Mogensen) - 4:12
 "The Last Jim" (Larsen-Beckerlee) - 2:52

Note: Mogens Mogensen co-wrote the lyrics with Gasolin'.

Credits

Gasolin'

Kim Larsen - vocals, guitar plus some bass and moog
Franz Beckerlee - lead guitar, moog, backup vocals
Wili Jønsson - bass, piano, backup vocals
Søren Berlev - drums, percussion, backup vocals
Produced by Roy Thomas Baker
Engineered by Freddy Hansson
Recorded and mixed during the fall of 1974 in Rosenberg Studio

References

Gasolin' albums
1974 albums
Albums produced by Roy Thomas Baker